WFHB 91.3 FM is a community radio FM station in Bloomington, Indiana, United States. The station has three translators serving southern Indiana: 98.1 in Bloomington, 100.7 in Nashville and 106.3 in Ellettsville.

WFHB has a small paid staff and over 150 volunteers, who perform a range of duties, from office administration to music and news programming. The station is supported financially by contributions from listeners and program underwriting by local businesses, as well as by community service grants from the Corporation for Public Broadcasting.

Station history
The idea for WFHB began in 1974, conceived by Mark Hood, Jeffrey Morris, and Craig Palmer. They founded a 501c3 non-profit organization the same year called Community Radio Project (CRP) in order to establish a community radio station in Bloomington, Indiana. In June 1976, CRP organizers Mark Hood, Robyn Carey, and Jim Manion attended NARC II, the second National Alternative Radio Conference, held in Telluride, Colorado. NARC II was organized by the recently established National Federation of Community Broadcasters and hosted by KOTO, Telluride’s community radio station, which had begun broadcasting in 1975. 

Community radio organizers from around the US were in attendance and the CRP organizers became more aware of the nascent community radio movement. Upon returning from the conference, CRP began the process of applying for a Federal Communications Commission (FCC) license and raising the necessary funds. Nineteen years later, on January 4, 1993, following numerous applications and several court cases, WFHB began broadcasting on 91.3MHz from their transmitter site in rural Monroe County, Indiana. In February 1994, station operations moved to a former city fire station in downtown Bloomington.

Translators
In addition to its main frequency, WFHB is relayed by three translators to widen its broadcast area.

Local News and Public Affairs Programs
 Activate!
 Artbeat
 Better Beware
 Bicentennial Journal
 Big Talk
 BloomingOUT
 Bring It On!
 Brown County Hour
 CATSweek
 EcoReport
 Hola Bloomington
 Interchange
 Kite Line
 Local News
 Standing Room Only
 Voices in the Street

See also
List of community radio stations in the United States

References

External links

 BRING IT ON
 Daily Local News  
 Interchange
 Standing Room Only
 EcoReport
 bloomingOUT
 Hola Bloomington
 Bloomington Storytelling Project
 Harvest Home
 What's The Juice?
 Brown County Hour
  CATSweek
 Sweatbox
 Specials

Radio stations established in 1993
Community radio stations in the United States
FHB
1993 establishments in Indiana